Marie-Hélène Aubert (born 16 November 1955 in Nantes) is a French politician and former Member of the European Parliament for the West of France. She is a member of the Socialist Party, having quit the Greens in 2008. Aubert was a Vice Chair of the ACP-EU Joint Parliamentary Assembly.

References

1955 births
Living people
Socialist Party (France) politicians
The Greens (France) politicians
MEPs for West France 2004–2009
The Greens (France) MEPs
21st-century women MEPs for France